The Wrestlers is a public house on the Great North Road in Hatfield, Hertfordshire, England. 
The Grade II listed building has an eighteenth-century chequered red brick front, but it is based on a sixteenth-century core which preserves some of its timber framing.

References

External links

Pubs in Welwyn Hatfield (district)
Grade II listed pubs in Hertfordshire
Hatfield, Hertfordshire